St. Peter and St. Paul's Church is a parish of the Catholic Church located in Tula, Russia. It is a Latin-rite parish of the Archdiocese of Moscow.

History
At the turn of the twentieth century, there were already a thousand Catholics in Tula and its surroundings, and the former chapel there became insufficient. The community received permission to build a church on May 28, 1893. The new brick church, built in the neo-Gothic style by the architect Skawronski, was consecrated in 1896. After the revolution of 1917 and the end of World War I in the West, many Poles migrated to the new Poland, and the parish was weakened. The church property was nationalized in 1918 and closed in 1932. A newspaper occupied the building.

The Catholic parish was restored in 1993 and temporarily settled in 1995 in an old garage. In 2015 it received permission to recover the church, which required restoration. It re-opened on December 23, 2007 and Archbishop Paolo Pezzi blessed it on July 6, 2008.

See also
Catholic Church in Russia
St. Peter and St. Paul's Church

References

Buildings and structures in Tula, Russia
Roman Catholic churches completed in 1896
Religious organizations established in 1893
Gothic Revival church buildings in Russia
19th-century Roman Catholic church buildings in Russia
Objects of cultural heritage of Russia of regional significance
Cultural heritage monuments in Tula Oblast